Barbara Rachael Fati Palepa Edmonds is a New Zealand politician and Member of Parliament in the House of Representatives for the Labour Party. She is Minister of Internal Affairs and Minister for Pacific Peoples in the Sixth Labour Government.

Early life and career
Edmonds was born Rachael Fati Poe, in North Shore, Auckland, to parents Selani (Fale’ula, Faleatiu) and Palepa (Safotu, Fasito’o) who had immigrated from Western Samoa in 1978. Her mother died when she was four years old and Edmonds inherited her name Palepa (Barbara) on her fifth birthday. 

Edmonds was educated at Carmel College and the University of Auckland. Her school was next door to North Shore Hospital where members of her family were working in the kitchen, laundry and as cleaners. She married Chris Edmonds, who she met at age 16 and with whom she shares eight children. Edmonds was a parent elected member of the Board of Trustees of Mana College.

Edmonds is a specialist tax lawyer, and before entering Parliament, worked in both the private and public sectors. In 2016, she was seconded from Inland Revenue to work as a private secretary to Michael Woodhouse and Judith Collins, as Ministers of Revenue. In 2017, she was appointed as a political adviser to Stuart Nash.

Political career

In August 2020,  Edmonds was ranked 49th on the Labour Party's list.

Following the election, she was appointed as Labour's associate whip on 2 November. She was deputy chair of the Finance and Expenditure Committee from 3 December 2020 to 22 June 2022, when she became chair. 

In a cabinet reshuffle by Prime Minister Chris Hipkins on 31 January 2023 Edmonds was appointed a minister for Internal Affairs, Pacific Peoples, Associate Health (Pacific Peoples) and Associate Housing.

References

External links
 

Living people
New Zealand people of Samoan descent
New Zealand Labour Party MPs
Members of the New Zealand House of Representatives
Women members of the New Zealand House of Representatives
21st-century New Zealand politicians
21st-century New Zealand women politicians
Year of birth missing (living people)
Members of the Cabinet of New Zealand
Female interior ministers
Women government ministers of New Zealand